Ourapteryx claretta is a moth of the family Geometridae first described by Jeremy Daniel Holloway in 1982. It is found in Sundaland.

External links

Ourapterygini